Gonanda dynasties are ancient Hindu dynasties which ruled Kashmir region.

Gonanda dynasty may refer to:

 Gonanda dynasty (I), Indian dynasty started by Gonanda I
  Gonanditya dynasty (c. 1175 – 167 BCE), Indian dynasty started by Gonanda III
 Gonanda dynasty (II) (c. 25 – 345 CE), Indian dynasty started by Meghavahana

Gonanda dynasty